{{DISPLAYTITLE:C8H16O2}}
The molecular formula C8H16O2 may refer to:

 Butyl butyrate
 Caprylic acid
 Cyclohexanedimethanol
 Ethyl hexanoate
 2-Ethylhexanoic acid
 Hexyl acetate
 Manzanate
 Pentyl propanoate
 2,2,4,4-Tetramethyl-1,3-cyclobutanediol
 Valproic acid